Brazybreen is a glacier in Sørkapp Land at Spitsbergen, Svalbard. It has a length of about two kilometers, and is located north of Sørkappfonna, between Guilbaudtoppen and Roaldryggen. The glacier is named after Gilbert Georges Paul Brazy.

References

Glaciers of Spitsbergen